Maguse Lake is a lake in Kivalliq Region, Nunavut, Canada. The area is frequented by caribou. A fifteen-year project building a road to Maguse Lake from Arviat was completed in 2010.

References

External links

Lakes of Kivalliq Region